Punk Core Records is an inactive record label founded in 1989 by Dave Punk Core. The label is based on Long Island, New York. 
Punk Core originally started out a punk zine/distro in the late 1980s, but became a record label in the mid 1990s. Punk Core is often credited for helping to revive street punk, a genre that had flourished in early 1980s Britain but had disappeared by the end of the decade. Punk Core brought global exposure to many underground bands especially out of the New York area.

In 2006, Punk Core Records released the compilation DVD, Pure Punk Rock. The DVD was directed by punk filmmaker Lewis Smithingham, and featured live performances from all of the bands on the label. The label is inactive, the last new release having been March 11, 2008

Bands 
 Action
 A Global Threat
 Career Soldiers
 The Casualties
 Clit 45 (Your Life to Choose EP)
 Chaotic Dischord
 Cheap Sex
 Cropknox
 Damage Case
 Defiance
 The Devotchkas
 Fists In The System
 Funeral Dress
 The Havoc
 Instant Agony (Not My Religion EP)
 Lower Class Brats
 Monster Squad
 The Messengers
 Oxblood 
 Paxton Boys
 Self Destruct (Violent Affair EP, the band featured members of The Unseen and A Global Threat)
 SS-Kaliert 
 The Scarred
 Total Chaos
 The Unseen (The Complete Singles Collection 1994–2000)
 The Varukers
 The Virus
 The Warning

See also 
 List of record labels

References 

American record labels
Record labels established in 1989
Record labels disestablished in 2008
Punk record labels